Sid Smith (born July 24, 1986 in Six Nations, Ontario) is an Iroquois lacrosse player who plays for the Rochester Knighthawks of the National Lacrosse League.

Junior career
Smith played for the Six Nations Arrows of the OLA Junior A Lacrosse League. Smith would lead the Arrows to four straight league championships. Smith won the John "Gus" McCauley Memorial Trophy as the league’s Defender of the Year in both 2006 and 2007. In 2006, he also won the Jim Bishop Memorial Award as the Most Sportsmanlike Player in the Minto Cup Tournament. In 2007, Smith won the B.W. "Bill" Evans Award for the league's Top Graduating Player and the Dean McLeod Award as the league's Playoffs Most Valuable Player. Smith also captained the 2007 team to Six Nations' first Minto Cup national championship since 1992.

College career

Onondaga Community College
Smith began his college career at Onondaga Community College. Smith played alongside fellow Six Nations players Craig Point and Cody Jamieson and led the Lazers to the 2006 NJCAA national championship with an undefeated 18-0 overall record. He was named a 2006 NJCAA First-Team All-American.

Syracuse University
During his two years with Syracuse (2008-2009), Smith helped the Orange to back-to-back national championships. He was Honorable Mention All-American in 2008 and Second-Team All-American in 2009.

Professional career

Major League Lacrosse
Smith was drafted sixth overall by the Toronto Nationals in the 2009 Major League Lacrosse Collegiate Draft. As a rookie, he was a member of the 2009 MLL Champion Nationals.

National Lacrosse League
On September 9, 2009, Smith was selected first overall by the Rochester Knighthawks in the 2009 National Lacrosse League entry Draft.

Smith was a member of the 2012, 2013 and 2014 NLL Champion Rochester Knighthawks and captain of the 2013 and 2014 teams.

Canadian Senior "A"
Smith was a member of the 2013 Mann Cup Champion Six Nations Chiefs.

Statistics

Major League Lacrosse
Reference:

Note: Smith was on the Toronto Nationals' roster in 2010, but he did not appear in any games.

National Lacrosse League
Reference:

Canadian Lacrosse Association

References

External links
 Bio from Syracuse University web site

1986 births
Living people
Iroquois nations lacrosse players
Lacrosse people from Ontario
Native American sportspeople
Rochester Knighthawks players
Hamilton Nationals players
First Nations sportspeople
Lacrosse defenders